Gary Spears is an Australian former rugby league footballer who played in the 1970s and 1980s.  He played for Balmain and the Canberra Raiders in the New South Wales Rugby League (NSWRL) competition.

Playing career
Spears made his first grade debut for Balmain in Round 2 1977 against South Sydney at Redfern Oval.  In the same year, Balmain reached the finals after finishing 4th.  Spears played in the club's minor semi final victory over Manly-Warringah but did not play in semi final defeat against Eastern Suburbs.

Spears played with Balmain up until the end of 1982 with not much success as the club finished last with the wooden spoon in 1981 although they did reach the final of the Tooth Cup against Parramatta in 1980.

In 1983, Spears joined newly admitted Canberra who joined the premiership a year prior.  Spears became a regular in the Canberra side over the next 4 seasons but the club missed out on playing in the finals in each year he was there.  Spears retired at the end of the 1986 season.  The following year, Canberra would reach their first grand final against Manly.

References

1957 births
Living people
Balmain Tigers players
Canberra Raiders players
Australian rugby league players
Rugby league players from Sydney
Rugby league second-rows
Rugby league locks